In the USA, as well as in most developed countries, the low-end market consists of lower-priced products suitable for customers who are not willing or able to spend large amounts of money.

Many well known companies, such as Wal-Mart or British supermarket Asda, sell low-end versions of a given product apart from their standard goods.

See also
 Inferior good

Market (economics)